Little Venice is a district in London. 

Little Venice may also refer to:

 Little Venice (ward), an electoral ward of the Westminster City Council
 Little Venice, Michigan, an unincorporated area northwest of Charlotte, Michigan
 Klein-Venedig (German for Little Venice), the name for a failed German attempt to settle Venezuela in the 16th and 17th centuries
 Petite Venise, at the Palace of Versailles
 Venezuela, Spanish for Little Venice
 A nickname for Chioggia, Italy

See also
 Venice (disambiguation)
 Venice of the North

Lists of cities by nickname